Susannah is a feminine given name. It is an English version of the Hebrew name Shoshana, meaning lily. Other variants of the name include Susanna, Susana, Susan, Suzanne, and Susie.

Notable people bearing this name include:
Susannah Breslin, American writer
Susannah Carr (born 1952), Australian news anchor
Susannah Carter (fl. 1765), English cookbook author
Susannah Lattin (1848–1868), American woman who died at illegal adoption clinic
Susannah Maria Cibber (1714–1766), English singer and actress
Susannah Constantine (born 1962), English fashion advisor
Susannah Corbett (born 1968), English actress and author
Susannah Darwin (1765–1817), mother of Charles Darwin
Susannah Doyle (born 1966), English actress, playwright, and film director
Susannah Fielding (born 1985), English actress
Susannah Fiennes (born 1961), British artist
Susannah Fowle (born 1958), Australian actress
Susannah Grant (born 1963), American screenwriter and director
Susannah Gunning (1740–1800), British novelist
Susannah Hagan (born 1951), English professor
Susannah Harker (born 1965), English actress
Susannah Holford (1864–1944), English noblewoman
Susannah Johnson (born 1990), American gymnast
Susannah Willard Johnson (c. 1729–1810), American captured in Abenaki raid
Susannah Lamplugh, British murder victim
Susannah Martin (1621–1692), woman executed during Salem witch trials
Susannah McCorkle (1946–2001), American jazz singer
Susannah Meadows, American writer for Newsweek magazine
Susannah Melvoin (born 1964), American vocalist, songwriter, and actress
Susannah Sheldon, accuser during Salem witch trials
Susannah Stacey, pseudonym used by writers Jill Staynes and Margaret Storey
Susannah Waters, British soprano
Susannah Wise, English actress
Susannah York (1939–2011), British actress

Fictional characters bearing the name Susannah include
Susanna (Book of Daniel)
Susannah, title character of the opera of the same name
Susannah, the eponymous character of the Libby Gleeson novel I Am Susannah
Susannah Dean, character from Stephen King's The Dark Tower series
Susannah Morrisey, character in the defunct soap opera Brookside
Susannah, title character of Muriel Denison's novel Susannah of the Mounties
Susannah, title character in "Susannah's Still Alive", a single by The Kinks
Susannah Simon, protagonist of The Mediator Series
Princess Susannah, fictional character in Black Mirror

See also
Susanna (given name)
Susana (given name)
Susan
Susie (disambiguation)
Suzanne (given name)
Susanne (given name)
Sue (name)
Zuzana (given name)

References

Feminine given names
Given names derived from plants or flowers